Tolcarne is the name of a number of places in Cornwall, United Kingdom. The name Tolcarne is derived from Cornish Talkarn i.e. "hill-brow tor". A carn is a pile of stones (usually natural) and is the same as tor in Devon.
 
Talkarn is the old name of Minster near Boscastle.

Places named Tolcarne include,
 part of Newlyn on the east side of the Newlyn River and formerly a separate hamlet in the civil parish of Madron.
 A hamlet south of Camborne near Troon.
 A hamlet in the parish and village of St Day.
 Tolcarne and Lower Tolcarne in the parish of  St Allen.
 A farm near Porkellis in the parish of Wendron.
 Tolcarne Wartha and Little Tolcarne. Wartha is higher in Cornish.
 Tolcarne and Tolcarne Wood in the parish of St Just-in-Roseland.
 Tolcarne Point and Tolcarne Beach, Newquay.
 Tolcarne and Tolcarne Tor are north-west of North Hill and Trebartha. Tolcarne near Trebartha was a manor recorded in the Domesday Book (1086) when it belonged to Tavistock Abbey. It was one of several manors held from the abbey by Ermenhald. There was land for 1 plough; there were 2 smallholders who had 2 oxen and one acre of pasture. The value of the manor was 5 shillings.

References

Hamlets in Cornwall
Manors in Cornwall